Petr Tomaily (Cyrillic: Петр Томайлы; born 21 October 1965 in Cioc-Maidan, Moldavian SSR) is a Transnistrian businessman and politician, who previously served as a member of the Transnistrian parliament for the political party Obnovlenie.

He was a candidate for President in the 2006 election, standing as an independent, and finished last in a four-candidate race.

He is an entrepreneur and owner of a private business in Bender. He is an ethnic Gagauz.

Personal life 
He is  -- shorter than typical. He speaks Turkic, fluent English, Romanian and Russian, When he was 2 years old, his right arm became disabled.

External links 
 Peter Tomaily Official parliamentary biography

1965 births
Living people
Gagauz people
People from Gagauzia
Transnistrian people of Gagauz descent
Obnovlenie politicians
Politicians with disabilities